Todd Robert Risley (September 8, 1937 – November 2, 2007) was an American psychologist. He is credited with helping to create the field of applied behavior analysis, and has been described as a "pioneer" in this field. He is known for the study he conducted with Betty Hart, who was his graduate student at the University of Kansas at the time, on the word gap between rich and poor children. He was also a co-founder and editor-in-chief of the Journal of Applied Behavior Analysis.

References

1937 births
2007 deaths
20th-century American psychologists
San Diego State University alumni
University of Washington alumni
University of Kansas faculty
University of Alaska Anchorage faculty
Academic journal editors